The 1988 Dow Chemical Classic was a women's tennis tournament played on grass courts at the Edgbaston Priory Club in Birmingham in the United Kingdom and was part of the Category 2 tier of the 1988 WTA Tour. It was the seventh edition of the tournament and was held from 6 June until 12 June 1988. Claudia Kohde-Kilsch won the singles title.

Finals

Singles

 Claudia Kohde-Kilsch defeated  Pam Shriver 6–2, 6–1
 It was Kohde-Kilsch's 1st title of the year and the 29th of her career.

Doubles

 Larisa Savchenko /  Natasha Zvereva defeated  Leila Meskhi /  Svetlana Parkhomenko 6–4, 6–1
 It was Savchenko's 1st title of the year and the 9th of her career. It was Zvereva's 1st title of the year and the 1st of her career.

References

External links
 Official website
 ITF tournament edition details

Dow Chemical Classic
Birmingham Classic (tennis)
Dow
Dow Chemical Classic